Aphnaeus charboneli, the Charbonel's silver spot, is a butterfly in the family Lycaenidae. It is found in Ghana, Cameroon and the Democratic Republic of the Congo. The habitat consists of upland evergreen forests and forests at sea level.

References

Butterflies described in 1996
Aphnaeus